Clanculus flagellatus is a species of sea snail, a marine gastropod mollusk in the family Trochidae, the top snails.

Description
The size of the shell varies between 12 mm and 19 mm. The umbilicate, granulate shell has a conoid shape. It is white, painted with branching stripes of reddish purple. The whorls are convex, the last rounded. The; white base of the shell is convex. The penultimate whorl contains six series of granules, with the interstices as wide as the ridges, and is obliquely striate. The body whorl has eight series of granules above, nine on the base. The oblique columella is solute above, the edge rugose-denticulate, terminating below in a prominent tooth. The outer lip is rugose and dentate within. The whorls are pretty convex, especially above. The body whorl is rounded, deflected anteriorly and flattened. The penultimate whorl has six series of granules, which are the same width as their densely striate interstices. The body whorl however has eight, two new ones having been intercalated on the lower part, the eighth prominent, forming the periphery. The base of the shell is rather convex, and has nine close granulose lirae. The granules on the border of the umbilicus are but slightly developed. The aperture is about as in Clanculus pharaonius. The color of the shell is white, with numerous dark rose-red radiating, sometimes branching stripes above.

Distribution
This marine species is endemic to Australia and occurs off South Australia, Tasmania, Victoria and Western Australia.

References

 Philippi, R.A. 1849. Centuria altera Testaceorum novorum. Zeitschrift für Malakozoologie 5: 99–112
 Pritchard, G.B. & Gatliff, J.H. 1902. Catalogue of the marine shells of Victoria. Part V. Proceedings of the Royal Society of Victoria 14(2): 85–138
 May, W.L. 1921. A Checklist of the Mollusca of Tasmania. Hobart, Tasmania : Government Printer 114 pp.
 May, W.L. 1923. An Illustrated Index of Tasmanian Shells. Hobart : Government Printer 100 pp.
 Iredale, T. 1924. Results from Roy Bell's molluscan collections. Proceedings of the Linnean Society of New South Wales 49(3): 179–279, pl. 33-36
 Cotton, B.C. & Godfrey, F.K. 1934. South Australian Shells. Part 11. South Australian Naturalist 15(3): 77–92
 Macpherson, J.H. & Gabriel, C.J. 1962. Marine Molluscs of Victoria. Melbourne : Melbourne University Press & National Museum of Victoria 475 pp.
 Cotton, B.C. 1959. South Australian Mollusca. Archaeogastropoda. Handbook of the Flora and Fauna of South Australia. Adelaide : South Australian Government Printer 449 pp
 Wilson, B. 1993. Australian Marine Shells. Prosobranch Gastropods. Kallaroo, Western Australia : Odyssey Publishing Vol. 1 408 pp.
 Jansen, P. 1995. A review of the genus Clanculus Montfort, 1810 (Gastropoda: Trochidae) in Australia, with description of a new subspecies and the introduction of a nomen novum. Vita Marina 43(1–2): 39–62

External links
 To Biodiversity Heritage Library (5 publications)
 To World Register of Marine Species
 

flagellatus
Gastropods described in 1848
Taxa named by Rodolfo Amando Philippi